Vladimir Gusev may refer to:

Vladimir Gusev (cyclist) (born 1982), Russian road racing cyclist
Vladimir Gusev (ice hockey) (born 1982), Russian ice hockey player
Vladimir Gusev (politician) (born 1932), Soviet and Russian politician
Vladimir Gusev (art historian) (born 1945), Russian art historian
Vladimir Gusev (runner) (born 1961), Kazakhstani long-distance runner and participant at the 1997 IAAF World Half Marathon Championships